Giants, Monsters & Dragons: An Encyclopedia of Folklore, Legend and Myth is an encyclopedia of monsters, folklore, myths, and legends compiled by Carol Rose. The book features small entries about monsters, folklore, myths and legends from around the world, and includes many illustrations.

References

External links 
Preview of the book from Google Books
The Book's cover art
W. W. Norton Publishing

2001 non-fiction books
Books about dragons
Encyclopedias of culture and ethnicity
Mythology books
Supernatural books
W. W. Norton & Company books
Books about folklore